Gerry Polci (born June 9, 1952) is an American singer and musician who was a member of the American rock and pop band The Four Seasons.

Polci played and sang in the band variously between 1973 and 1990. He sang lead and played drums on a number of their major hits, including the 1976 and 1994 worldwide hit, "December, 1963 (Oh, What a Night)".

Polci was married briefly to Antonia Valli, the daughter of Frankie Valli. Their daughter, Olivia Valli, is now a musical theatre performer, including taking the role of her own grandmother in the musical Jersey Boys that dramatizes the early days of the band. He was also married to Rhea Gay Chiles, daughter of late U.S. Senator and Florida Governor Lawton Chiles and Rhea Grafton Chiles. 

Interspersed with performing with the Four Seasons, Polci arranged for Barry Manilow for his television specials and did other musical work. After leaving the Four Seasons, he returned to college at Montclair State University in New Jersey and, at the age of 43, began a teaching career at New Providence Middle School. He also performed with the band he co-founded in 2007, 'The Hit Men' — fellow members included his former bandmates in The Four Seasons, Lee Shapiro and Don Ciccone.

References

External links 
 

1952 births
Living people
American male pop singers
American male drummers
The Four Seasons (band) members